The Jesuits etc. Act 1603 (1 Jac. I, c. 4), full title An Act for the due execution of the Statutes against Jesuits, seminary Priests and recusants, was an Act of Parliament passed by the Parliament of England during the reign of James I. It received the royal assent on 4 July 1604 and confirmed the Elizabethan penal laws. It also enacted new penalties for Catholics who sent their children abroad to be educated in Catholic colleges. In order to placate the Catholic powers, James privately reassured the French envoy that he had no intention of enforcing the statute.

Notes

1603 in law
1603 in England
Acts of the Parliament of England